Sojourner Truth Organization was a new communist group formed in the winter of 1969, prominent in the Midwest through 1985. Oriented towards organization in the workplace, and named after African American activist Sojourner Truth, the organization distinguished itself from other New Left groups in its critical approach to the role of race in the formation of the American working class.

History and ideology 
Noel Ignatiev, a former leader of the Students for a Democratic Society, became a prominent member of the STO, and expressed the group's sentiment:

in modern industrial societies, bourgeois rule depends on the development of a variety of "systems" that channel the outbreaks of the exploited class and allow their absorption by capital; that the specifically American framework for this process is the white-skin privilege system — the conferring of a favored status on the white sector of the proletariat; and that the trade unions cannot be understood apart from this framework.

Ignatiev would later contribute to the formulation of critical race theory, and edit Race Traitor magazine.

According to historian Michael Staudenmaier, "The Sojourner Truth Organization was founded in Chicago at the end of 1969, partly by people who had been involved with the RYM II faction of the recently crumbled SDS. The group largely turned its back on the student milieu, and instead focused its efforts on what has been variously called "industrial concentration" or "(point of) production work." This focus dominated the group's first several years, until the mid-1970s. During this time, the bulk of the membership (close to 50 people at some points) was employed full-time in a variety of factories throughout the Chicago area. In this context, the group agitated for what it called mass revolutionary independent workers' organizations, built alliances with black and Latino revolutionaries in workplaces, and struggled around a variety of campaigns that reflected the group's strategic orientation of placing the struggle against white supremacy front and center. Since STO was the first post-new left group in Chicago to emphasize production work, it was able to tap into and relate to a strikingly broad range of workplace struggles, wildcat strikes, and independent organizing efforts. Some of the best stories told by former members focus on these experiences. Still, the failure to build any sort of lasting momentum (much less a mass organization) caused STO to reflect critically on the limitations of industrial concentration as the group had practiced it throughout the early 1970s.

References

Further reading

External links 
 Sojourner Truth Organization (1969-1985) - Digital Archive – A digital repository of the Sojourner Truth Organization's pamphlets, newspapers, and propaganda

Sojourner Truth
Political organizations based in the United States
Communism in the United States
1969 establishments in Illinois
1985 disestablishments in the United States